Chandler Blue Isip McDaniel (born February 4, 1998) is a footballer who plays as a forward. Born in the United States, she represents the Philippines women's national team.

Early life
McDaniel was born in Orange, California to Lindy, a Filipino who has connections to Pampanga and Davao City, and Clint who works as a football (soccer) coach. She played for the women's team of Norco High School.

College career
In college, McDaniel played for the Virginia Tech Hokies and later with the Milwaukee Panthers. She entered Virginia Polytechnic Institute in 2016 as a freshman, playing for the Hokies until her sophomore year in 2017. She later transferred to University of Wisconsin-Milwaukee making 37 appearances and two goals for the Milwaukee Panthers in her junior and senior years (2018–19).

International career
McDaniel's first cap for the Philippines women's national team was at the 2022 AFC Women's Asian Cup qualifiers in the Philippines' 2–1 win over Nepal on September 18, 2021. McDaniel provided the assist which contributed to the goals of teammates Tahnai Annis and Camille Wilson which overturned the one-goal lead of Nepal in the last minutes of the game. She scored her first goal in the Philippines 2–1 win against Hong Kong on September 24, 2021 which secured her country's qualification for the Asian Cup.

McDaniel was called up to represent the Philippines earlier at the 2018 AFC Women's Asian Cup but was not part of the final squad. She also participated in the Philippine national tryouts for the 2016 AFF Women's Championship. She featured in the 2022 AFC Women's Asian Cup where she helped qualify her team for the 2023 FIFA Women's World Cup but sustained a major injury in the process.

International goals
Scores and results list the Philippines' goal tally first.

Personal life
Chandler's siblings are also footballers. Her older sister Olivia is a goalkeeper for the Philippine national team while her younger brother Griffin has suited up for Filipino club Stallion Laguna.

References

1998 births
Living people
Citizens of the Philippines through descent
Filipino women's footballers
Women's association football forwards
Women's association football midfielders
Philippines women's international footballers
People from Norco, California
Soccer players from California
American women's soccer players
University of Wisconsin–Milwaukee alumni
Virginia Tech alumni
Virginia Tech Hokies women's soccer players
Milwaukee Panthers women's soccer players
American sportspeople of Filipino descent
Women's Premier Soccer League players